Donald Trump endorsements may refer to:

List of Donald Trump 2016 presidential campaign endorsements
List of Donald Trump 2020 presidential campaign endorsements
List of endorsements by Donald Trump, candidates endorsed by Donald Trump

See also
 Donald Trump (disambiguation)